Zanbil is a small island in the Caspian Sea off the Bay of Baku, Azerbaijan. It is also known as Duvanni Island.

Etymology
The name Zanbil is Persian (زنبیل) and means "a big basket". The name "Duvanni" (Дуванный), meaning "money" in Russian, is connected to Stepan Razin.

Geography
The island is part of the Baku Archipelago, located in the Ələt (Alat) municipality area, which consists of the following islands: Boyuk Zira, Dash Zira, Qum Island, Zanbil, Sangi-Mugan, Chikil, Qara Su, Khara Zira, Gil, Ignat Dash and a few smaller ones.

The area of Zanbil Island is 0.4 km2. Its length is 0.9 km and its maximum width 0.5 km.

There is a 25 m high mud volcano on Zanbil.

See also

Petroleum industry in Azerbaijan

References

Islands of Azerbaijan
Islands of the Caspian Sea
Mud volcanoes of Azerbaijan
Uninhabited islands of Azerbaijan